José María Relucio Gallego (born 9 February 1998), commonly known as Relu, is a Spanish footballer who plays for the Swiss club YF Juventus as a midfielder.

Club career
Born in Madrid, Relu represented Real Madrid, Rayo Vallecano and Atlético Madrid as a youth. In July 2017, he agreed to a move to Internazionale, but the deal was later called off and he joined Deportivo Alavés instead, being loaned to Tercera División side CF Trival Valderas on 24 August.

Relu made his senior debut on 3 September 2017, playing the last 11 minutes in a 1–1 away draw against CF Pozuelo de Alarcón. He scored his first goal on 3 December, netting the opener in a 2–2 home draw against CDF Tres Cantos.

In September 2018, Relu agreed to a contract with AD Alcorcón, being initially assigned to B-team also in the fourth tier. He made his professional debut the following 24 March, coming on as a second-half substitute for Richard Boateng in a 1–3 loss at Elche CF in the Segunda División.

On 21 June 2019, after only four first-team matches, Relu signed for Bundesliga side Borussia Dortmund, being initially assigned to the reserves. On 14 July 2020, after having his appearances limited due to a knee injury, he returned to his home country and joined Getafe CF's B-team in the Segunda División B.

References

External links
AD Alcorcón profile 

1998 births
Living people
Footballers from Madrid
Spanish footballers
Association football midfielders
Deportivo Alavés B players
CF Trival Valderas players
AD Alcorcón B players
AD Alcorcón footballers
Getafe CF B players
Borussia Dortmund II players
Atlético Levante UD players
SC Young Fellows Juventus players
Segunda División players
Segunda División B players
Segunda Federación players
Tercera División players
Regionalliga players
Swiss Promotion League players
Spanish expatriate footballers
Spanish expatriate sportspeople in Germany
Expatriate footballers in Germany
Spanish expatriate sportspeople in Switzerland
Expatriate footballers in Switzerland